Decameron were an English folk rock and progressive rock band, existing from 1968 to 1976.

History
Initially formed in 1968 in Cheltenham, Gloucestershire, England, by Johnny Coppin (guitar, vocals) and Dave Bell (guitar, vocals), the band were augmented in 1971 by the addition of Al Fenn on lead guitar and mandolin and Geoff March on violin and cello. Their first managers included future comedian Jasper Carrott. They originally signed to Vertigo Records in 1973 and recorded their debut album, Say Hello to the Band, that year. By 1974, the band's line-up changed with Dik Cadbury joining the group on lead and 12-string acoustic guitar and bass. Geoff March incorporated keyboards into his repertoire and the band signed to Mooncrest Records to record the album, Mammoth Special, which showed a turn towards more introspective and progressive material, that was to define their sound for the remaining years of their existence.

Rumours of a missing third album called, Beyond the Light or Beyond the Days, have circulated incessantly. It was even given a catalog number, but it was ultimately scrapped, although supposedly some of its material has surfaced on compilations since.

In 1975, now on Transatlantic Records, Third Light, was produced by Tom Allom. A year later they added drummer Bob Critchley and released, Tomorrow's Pantomime. The sales were disappointing and Decameron disbanded shortly thereafter.

Discography
 1973: Say Hello to the Band 
 1974: Mammoth Special 
 1975: Third Light
 1976: Tomorrow's Pantomime

The first album has also been re-released on CD as a single disc with nine extra previously unreleased tracks. The latter three albums have since been reissued in full on a double-CD anthology entitled Parabola Road.

They collaborated with Nigel Mazlyn Jones on his 1976 album, Ship to Shore.

References

External links
 Decameron website

British folk rock groups
English progressive rock groups
Transatlantic Records artists